The Drinking Fountain is a Grade II-listed monument at Roehampton Lane, Roehampton, London SW15.

It was built in 1882, and designed by J. C. Radford.

References

External links
 

Grade II listed buildings in the London Borough of Wandsworth
Roehampton
Drinking fountains in the United Kingdom